Abubakar Aliyu Ibrahim (born 18 November 1994) is a Nigerian football player, who plays for Wikki Tourists.

Career
Aliyu went on trial with IK Start in February 2017, eventually signing permanently with the club.

He was loaned out to HamKam on 12 March 2018 for the rest of the season. He signed permanently with the club on 16 August 2018.

References

External links 
 
 
 

Articles using sports links with data from Wikidata
1994 births
Living people
Nigerian footballers
Nigeria international footballers
Nasarawa United F.C. players
Kano Pillars F.C. players
CA Bizertin players
IK Start players
Hamarkameratene players
Notodden FK players
Norwegian First Division players
Nigerian expatriate footballers
Expatriate footballers in Tunisia
Nigerian expatriate sportspeople in Tunisia
Expatriate footballers in Norway
Nigerian expatriate sportspeople in Norway
Expatriate footballers in the Faroe Islands
Nigerian expatriate sportspeople in the Faroe Islands
Association football forwards
Nigeria A' international footballers
2014 African Nations Championship players